Muduga, also called Mudugar, is an unclassified Southern Dravidian language of India influenced by Kannada and Tulu. It is mainly spoken by Muduga tribes in the Attappady valley south of the Nilgiris in Palakkad district, Kerala. It is mutually intelligible with Attapady Kurumba.

References

Dravidian languages